Marc Reyné de Trincheria (born 18 May 1999) is a Spanish field hockey player who plays for División de Honor club Real Club de Polo and the Spain national team.

Career 
He was an important member of the Spanish side which competed at the 2019 Men's EuroHockey Junior Championship where Spain finished at fourth place.

He was part of the Spanish national side which competed at the 2021–22 Men's FIH Pro League where Spain finished at seventh position. He is a member of the Spanish squad which is currently competing at the 2022–23 Men's FIH Pro League.

He was named in Spain's squad for the 2023 Men's EuroHockey Championship Qualifiers. He was also named in Spanish squad for the 2023 Men's FIH Hockey World Cup and it also marked his maiden FIH Hockey World Cup appearance.

References

External links
 

1999 births
Living people
Spanish male field hockey players
2023 Men's FIH Hockey World Cup players
Real Club de Polo de Barcelona players
División de Honor de Hockey Hierba players
Place of birth missing (living people)